"I'm Loving You" may refer to:

Music
"I'm Loving You", 1973 song by The Impressions, B-side to "Thin Line"
"(I'm) Lovin' You" 1975 song by Bobby Vee
"I'm Lovin' You", 2010 Japanese song by Iconiq
"I'm Loving You Softly", song by Smokey Robinson
"Tonight (I'm Lovin' You)", song by Enrique Iglesias
"I'm Loving You More Every Day" 1965 song by Leela James
"Yes, I'm Loving You" 1962 song by Big Al Downing